Nicolas Pierre Jean Lhernould (born 23 March 1975) is a French-born priest of the Catholic Church who has been appointed Bishop of Constantine, Algeria.

Biography
Nicolas Lhernould was born on 23 March 1975 in Courbevoie, on the outskirts of Paris. He attended the Lycée Sainte-Marie in Neuilly and made his first trip to Tunisia as part of group of young teachers. He obtained a licentiate in sociology from the University of Paris-Nanterre in 1995 and a master's degree in econometrics in 1996, and then a degree in social sciences from the École Normale Supérieure de Cachan in 1997. He then taught mathematics in Tunisia for two years.

In 1999, he entered the Pontifical French Seminary in Rome representing the Archdiocese of Tunis. He was ordained a priest of the Archdiocese of Tunis on 22 May 2004. He completed his theological studies, he obtained, a bachelor's degree in theology at the Pontifical Gregorian University in 2003 and a licenciate in sciences and patristic theology at the Patristic Institute Augustinianum in 2006, writing a study of the sermons of Fulgentius of Ruspe.

In Tunisia, he was pastor of Sousse, Monastir and Mahdia in the southern part of the country from 2005 to 2012. He was pastor of Sainte-Jeanne d'Arc in Tunis and vicar general of the diocese from 2012 to 2019. From 2009 to 2014 he was President of the Association of "Center of Studies of Carthage".

In July 2019 he was appointed to a five-year term as national director for Tunisia of the Pontifical Mission Societies.

Pope Francis appointed him Bishop of Constantine on 9 December 2019. The nomination makes him the youngest French bishop.

References

External links

1975 births
Living people
People from Courbevoie
Pontifical Gregorian University alumni
Pontifical French Seminary alumni
Patristic Institute Augustinianum alumni
Roman Catholic bishops of Constantine